Pakuan University (UNPAK) is a private university in Bogor. It was established on 1 November 1980 under the Foundation Pakuan Siliwangi. Pakuan University is at Jl. Pakuan PO Box 452, Bogor. In the academic year 2012/2013, In total, UNPAK offers 32 different programs of study to its students. In 2008, Dr. Bibin Rubini, MPd, was elected as the rector of UNPAK, a post that he has held since then.

Structure
Pakuan University has six faculties:
 Faculty of Law
 Faculty of Economics
 Faculty of Teacher Training & Education
 Faculty of Social Sciences & Humanities
 Faculty of Engineering
 Faculty of Mathematics & Natural Sciences

The Faculty of Social Science & Humanities has four departments:

A. Indonesia Literature

B. English Literature

C. Japanese Literature

D. Communication Science

Communication science has four concentrations:

a. Public Relations

b. Communication Management

c. Journalism

d. Broadcasting

External links
 

Universities in Indonesia
1980 establishments in Indonesia
Bogor
Universities in West Java